TN J0924-2201 is the second most distant radio galaxy known to date. It was discovered by Wil van Breugel in 1999.

See also
 List of galaxies

References

External links
 BBC News

Radio galaxies
Hydra (constellation)